was a town located in Miyoshi District, Tokushima Prefecture, Japan.

As of 2003, the town had an estimated population of 16,236 and a density of 96.76 persons per km². The total area was 167.8 km².

On March 1, 2006, Ikeda, along with the towns of Ikawa, Mino and Yamashiro, and the villages of Higashiiyayama and Nishiiyayama (all from Miyoshi District), was merged to create the city of Miyoshi.

External links

 

Dissolved municipalities of Tokushima Prefecture
Miyoshi, Tokushima